Weetamoo (c. 1635–1676), also referred to as Weethao, Weetamoe, Wattimore, Namumpum, and Tatapanunum, was a Pocasset Wampanoag Native American Chief. She was the sunksqua, or female sachem, of Pocasset tribe, which occupied contemporary Tiverton, Rhode Island in 1620.

In the Algonquian language of the Indigenous Peoples of the Northeastern United States and Canada, Weetamoo's name means "speak to them". She lived in Quequechan, now called Fall River, Massachusetts.

Early life 
Weetamoo was born in the Mattapoiset village of the Pokanoket or at Rhode Island's Taunton River area,. She was known as a bead worker/quiller and dancer. Her father was Corbitant, sachem of the Pocasset tribe in present-day North Tiverton, Rhode Island, c. 1618–1630.

Husbands and children 
In her lifetime, she had five husbands: Winnepurket, Wamsutta (Alexander), Quequequanachet, Petonowit, and Quinnapin. 

Her first husband, Winnepurket, was the Sachem of Saugus, Massachusetts and died shortly after they were married. 

Wamsutta (alternatively known by the English as Alexander, a name which he retained until his death), her second husband, was the eldest son of Massasoit, grand sachem of the Wampanoag and participant in the first Thanksgiving with the Pilgrims. They were married in or before 1653, and [it is speculated that] she had one child with Wamsutta, although the date of birth and name are unknown. During their marriage, the tribe allied with the English against the Narragansett, though the English later broke their treaty with the tribe. Wamsutta became sick and died during negotiations with the English and his brother Metacom (Philip) succeeded him as Chief of the Wampanoag. Metacom's wife was Weetamoo's sister, Wootonekanuske. 

Little is known about Weetamoo's third husband Quequequanachet, while she ended the marriage to her fourth husband Petonowit (called "Ben" by the English) when he sided with the English during King Philip's War.  

Her final marriage was to Quinnapin, the son of Niantic Narraganset sachem Ninigret and grandson of powerful Narragansett sachem Canonchet. He was described as "a handsome warrior" and they were married in September or August 1675. This marriage was designed to strengthen and reinforce the Wampanoag-Narragansett alliance against colonists. The marriage appeared to have been strong and the pair had at least one child together, who died in 1676. Quinnapin was captured in 1676.

Political career 
Because her father had no sons, she became sunksqua, and was defended by an army of more than 300 men that she commanded. Being a woman did not diminish her authority, despite many colonists' lack of understanding of her position. It has been theorized that some of the lesser-known sachems assumed to have been male may have been female sunksquas, especially since female leaders were not unheard of among the Algonquian tribes.

Weetamoo joined "with King Philip in fighting the colonists" in 1675, in King Philip's War, also known as "Metacomet's Rebellion." King Philip's War is named for the uprising of Metacomet, Weetamoo's brother in law and the younger brother of Wamsutta, who was also known by the English name Philip. Early on in the war, Weetamoo gave support to Metacomet by aiding his forces with the strength of her soldiers. Eventually, the English defeated the Wampanoag in August 1676.

Death 
Weetamoo drowned in the Taunton River in 1676. Her dead body was mutilated, and her head was displayed on a pole in Taunton, MA. Little else is known about her final days or death, or of the deaths of her soldiers who traveled with her. The story of her corpse being beheaded comes from the writings of minister Increase Mather.

Legacy
Weetamoo/Wattimore appears in Mary Rowlandson's The Captivity and Restoration of Mrs. Mary Rowlandson. In 1676, Weetamoo and her relative Quinnapin, the sachem of Narragansett, attacked a colonial settlement in Lancaster, Massachusetts. Rowlandson, who was captured and held by Quinnapin for three months, left a vivid description of Weetamoo's appearance as well as personality:

A severe and proud dame she was, bestowing every day in dressing herself neat as much time as any of the gentry of the land:  powdering her hair, and painting her face, going with necklaces, with jewels in her ears, and bracelets upon her hands.  When she had dressed herself, her work was to make girdles of wampum and beads.

Only women of rank were allowed to produce "Girdles of wampom and beads", and Weetamoo's production of these items reinforced her status. Wampum belts would be strung together with shells and were often used among Native Americans to deliver messages accompanied by speeches. Many places in the White Mountains of New Hampshire are also named after her, such as Weetamoo Falls, Mount Weetamoo, the Weetamoo Trail (which includes Weetamoo Glen and Weetamoo Rock), and the Six Husbands Trail, a reference to her marriages. However, there is no evidence that Weetamoo ever went to the White Mountains, and the area's focus on her may come from John Greenleaf Whittier's poem "The Bridal of Penacook," which names her as being from the area.

Weetamoo's adolescent life is depicted in the young adult historical novel, Weetamoo: Heart of the Pocasetts, in The Royal Diaries series.

Weetamoo Woods Open Space in Tiverton, Rhode Island is named after Weetamoo. A 50-foot vessel, Weetamoo, built in 1902, "was named after the daughter of an Indian Chief in John Greenleaf Whittier's poem Bride of Penacook." The vessel served on Lake Sunapee for 25 years before being scuttled. Lowell YWCA Camp Weetamoo is located on Long-Sought-for Pond in Westford, MA.

Notes

References

1635 births
1676 deaths
People from Massachusetts
Deaths by drowning
Female Native American leaders
King Philip's War
Native American women in warfare
17th-century women rulers
17th-century Native Americans
Women in 17th-century warfare
Wampanoag people
People of colonial Rhode Island
Native American people from Massachusetts
17th-century Native American women